Tangle Falls is a multi-tiered waterfall located in Jasper National Park along Icefields Parkway. It has 4 drops, and is 48 meters tall. Tangle Falls is 30 meters at its widest.

References 

Waterfalls of Alberta